Es lebe der König, der Vater im Lande (Long live the King, the father of the country), is a secular cantata by J. S. Bach to a text by Picander.  The work was composed in Leipzig for the name day of the Elector of Saxony, and first performed in August 1732. The music is lost. Picander's text was published in Ernst-Schertzhaffte und Satyrische Gedichte, Teil IV (Leipzig, 1737).

The first movement was likely used as a model for the opening chorus of Preise dein Glücke, gesegnetes Sachsen, BWV 215, a work that Bach composed at short notice in 1734.  BWV 215 is scored for double choir and festive orchestra with trumpets and timpani.

The cantata is counted among the works for celebrations of the Leipzig University, Festmusiken zu Leipziger Universitätsfeiern.

Notes

References

External links 
  (libretto only)

1732 compositions
Secular cantatas by Johann Sebastian Bach
Lost musical works by Johann Sebastian Bach